The Maricopa County Library District is a public library system located in central Arizona, United States.

The library district serves unincorporated areas in Maricopa County, Arizona. In addition, the district partners with cities/towns and school districts to operate their libraries. The district operates 18 libraries. Each year, the Library District welcomes up to three million visitors and holds thousands of free events and programs for all ages. More than 60 libraries from across the county participate in Maricopa County Reads, the award-winning Summer Reading Program created and hosted by MCLD. In 2020, the Library District held nearly 6,000 events, including 700 online events, and circulated 7.5 million physical and digital checkouts. For Maricopa County and Town of Queen Creek residents and property owners, a library card is free.

Branches 
 Aguila Library, Aguila
 Asante Library, Surprise (Coming in 2020)
 Ed Robson Library, Sun Lakes
 El Mirage Library, El Mirage
 Fairway Library, Sun City
 Fountain Hills Library, Fountain Hills
 Gila Bend Library, Gila Bend
 Goodyear Library, Goodyear
 Guadalupe Library, Guadalupe
 Hollyhock Library, Surprise
 Litchfield Park Library, Litchfield Park
 North Valley Regional Library, Anthem (co-located with Boulder Creek High School)
 Northwest Regional Library, Surprise
 Perry Library, Gilbert (co-located with Perry High School)
 Queen Creek Library, Queen Creek
 Southeast Regional Library, Gilbert
 Sun City Library, Sun City
 White Tank Library, Waddell

Collections and services
Maricopa County Library District is a popular materials system, meaning it does not contain academic or reference materials but offers audiobooks, children's books, and a collection of Blu-ray and DVDs. 

All libraries utilize the District's homegrown ShelfLogic classification system (formerly referred to as Dewey-less), which means they do not use the Dewey Decimal Classification format to file books. Instead, these libraries are set up with books and media located in "neighborhoods" by topic, like a modern bookstore.

The Maricopa County Library District also operates a virtual branch and a Books by Mail program that delivers large print materials through the U.S. Postal Service to people unable to come to the library.

The Maricopa County Library District has eMedia to provide downloads and streaming to desktops and mobile devices. The eMedia available include eBooks, audiobooks, magazines, TV & movies, and music. Customers also have access to Consumer Reports (website) and a series of research databases for homework and college prep, genealogy services, health information and more.

History
Maricopa County started a free library system the day after the stock market crash in 1929. The enormous population increases in the 1960s and 1970s led the County Library System to undergo reorganization to meet the demands of the residents. In 1986 the State Legislature passed a bill allowing Arizona counties to establish library districts. In 1987 the County Board of Supervisors voted to form the Maricopa County Library District (separate governmental and tax entities). The County Board of Supervisors serves as the District's Board of Library Directors.

In 2007, the Maricopa County Library District opened Perry Library, which abandoned the traditional Dewey Decimal System in favor of categorical shelving (i.e., Shelf Logic). Their Sun City Library moved to Shelf Logic in 2009 as did its Gila Bend (2012) North Valley Regional and El Mirage Libraries in 2013.

During fiscal year 2007–08, the library district welcomed more than 3 million customers and loaned more than 5 million units of materials.

In March 2009, the Goodyear Branch Library opened in temporary quarters in the Goodyear City Hall.

In May 2009, the Library District took over the once privately held Sun City Bell Branch Library and renamed it the Sun City Branch Library.

In 2014, the Library District began offering digital content to its customers.

The Maricopa County Board of Supervisors voted to eliminate overdue fines at County Libraries on May 22, 2019.

Awards and recognition
The Library District has received national awards for its programs and technology. In 2005 MCLD was awarded the John Cotton Dana Library Public Relations Award for The Mystery Club of Luna Drive, an original online serial novel.

The library district was awarded the Pioneer Award for Quality by The Arizona Quality Alliance in 2006.

In 2006 the district turned the book Tomás and the Library Lady by Pat Mora into a world premiere stage play adapted and performed by a professional children's theater company that toured schools and reached over 70,000 children. First Lady Laura Bush saw the play on invitation from the district. The theater company toured it nationally in 2007.

In 2009, the library district received the National Book Foundation—Innovation in Reading Prize for developing innovative means for creating and sustaining a lifelong love of reading — awarded to the District for its "Dewey-less" libraries. Several of the libraries in the district have adopted a bookstore format for shelving books and media by subject matter to make finding them easier for customers.

In 2017, the Library District was recognized as one of NACo's 100 Brilliant Ideas at work for its Teens Give Back program. In 2018, the Library District received 12 national awards from the National Association of Counties (NACo).

References

External links

 Maricopa County Library District

Education in Maricopa County, Arizona
Public libraries in Arizona
Buildings and structures in Maricopa County, Arizona
1929 establishments in Arizona